Chos grub ( Wiley  'gos chos grub) was a Tibetan translator who flourished in the early 9th Century and produced translations under the auspices of the Tibetan Empire.  Details of his life are sketchy, but he appears to have been based at Xiuduo Monastery 修多寺, in Dunhuang, during the Tibetan occupation of Gansu (which lasted from ca 755-848). He is best known as the translator of Woncheuk’s Saṃdhinirmocanasūtra Commentary which was subsequently known in Tibet as The Great Chinese Commentary (rgya cher 'grel pa). 

References

Further reading 
 Gardner, Alexander. (2019) "Go Chodrub" (b.755? - d.849) The Treasury of Lives. https://treasuryoflives.org/biographies/view/Go-Chodrub/TOL2002
 Takakusu, Junjirō (1901) "Tales of the Wise Man and the Fool, in Tibetan and Chinese." Journal of the Royal Asiatic Society of Great Britain and Ireland (New Series) 33.3: 447-460.

Translators to Tibetan
Translators from Chinese